The Farglory Ocean Park or Hualien Ocean Park is a water theme park in Yanliao Village, Shoufeng Township, Hualien, Taiwan. It is the first marine theme park in Taiwan.

History
The construction of the theme park started in April 2009 and was completed and opened in December 2002 with a total cost of US$160 million.

Architecture
The theme park spans over an area of 51 hectares, which are generally divided into the marine park and aquarium. The main amusement zones are the Brighton by the Sea, Crystal Castle, Discovery Island, Dolphin Lagoon, Harbor Square, Main Street, Mariner's Cove, and Underwater Kingdom. It also features a cable car.

Attractions
 Dolphin Show
 Fly across the Ocean
 Pirate of El Dorado

Transportation
The park is accessible southeast from Ji'an Station of Taiwan Railways.

See also
 List of tourist attractions in Taiwan

References

External links

 

2002 establishments in Taiwan
Amusement parks opened in 2002
Aquaria in Taiwan
Buildings and structures in Hualien County
Tourist attractions in Hualien County